Malihabad is a constituency of the Uttar Pradesh Legislative Assembly covering the city of Malihabad in the Lucknow district of Uttar Pradesh, India.

  
Malihabad is one of five assembly constituencies in the Mohanlalganj Lok Sabha constituency. Since 2008, this assembly constituency is numbered 168 amongst 403 constituencies.

Currently this seat belongs to Bharatiya Janata Party candidate Jai Devi who won in last Assembly election of 2017 Uttar Pradesh Legislative Elections defeating Samajwadi Party candidate Rajbala by a margin of 22,668 votes.

Members of Legislative Assembly

Election results

References
http://www.elections.in/uttar-pradesh/assembly-constituencies/malihabad.html

External links
 

Assembly constituencies of Uttar Pradesh
Politics of Lucknow district